Uzee is a given name or surname. Notable people with the name include:
Uzee Brown Jr. (born 1950), American musician
Uzee Usman (born 1986), Nigerian actor and film producer
Philip D. Uzee (1914–2010), American historian and economist